Shakal may refer to

Shakal Sandhya, 2005 Bengali film
Shakal Pe Mat Ja, 2011 Hindi film
Ram Shakal, Indian politician